The Golden Rooster Award for Best Animation (中国电影金鸡奖最佳美术片) is a category of competition of the Golden Rooster Awards.

Award Winners & Nominees

Notes:
The winner in each year is shown with a blue background.

See also

 List of animation awards

References

Golden Rooster, Best Animation
Animation, Best
Animation awards